Emmanuel Boakye Owusu (born 19 February 2000) is a Ghanaian professional footballer who plays as midfielder for Ghanaian Premier League side Bechem United F.C.

Career 
Owusu started his professional career with Bechem United in January 2018 ahead of the 2018 season. On 16 March 2018, he made his debut after coming on in at half time for Kwaku Bonsu Osei in a 3–0 loss to International Allies.

In his second game for the club on 25 March 2018, he started his first match and scored his debut goal to help Bechem to a 2–0 victory over Medeama SC. During his third match, he scored a goal in the 19th minute. The match however ended in a 1–1 draw due to a goal from Amos Addai. The league season was abandoned due to dissolution of the GFA in June 2018, as a result of the Anas Number 12 Expose, he therefore ended the season with 10 league matches and 2 goals. During the 2019 GFA Normalization competition, he made 10 appearances and scored 2 goals. He also made 7 league appearances during the 2019–20 season before it was truncated due to the outbreak of COVID-19 in Ghana.

Ahead of the 2020–21 season, he maintained his place in the team's squad list as the league was set to resume. He scored his first goal of the that season after converting a penalty in the 78th minute to equalize and lead Bechem do a comeback and win the match by 3–1 against Techiman Eleven Wonders. On 4 April 2021, after coming on for Clinton Duodu in the 87th minute, he scored a goal through an assist from Hafiz Konkoni which resulted in a 2–0 win over Dansoman-based club Liberty Professionals.

References

External links 

 

2000 births
Living people
Association football midfielders
Ghanaian footballers
Bechem United FC players